The 2020 Malaysia Premier League was the 17th season of the Malaysia Premier League, the second-tier professional football league in Malaysia since its establishment in 2004.

The season started on 29 February and should end on 20 July 2020. However, on 13 March, it was announced that the league would be suspended indefinitely, due to the ongoing COVID-19 pandemic. On 1 May, it was announced that the league would resume in September dependent on the situation at the time. Due to time constraints, the home-and-away format for the Super League and the Premier League has been scrapped. Teams played each other only once, meaning the champions of the Super League and Premier League were decided after eleven rounds of matches.

Team changes
A total of 12 teams contested the league, including 7 sides from the 2019 season, 3 relegated from the 2019 Malaysia Super League and 2 promoted from the 2019 Malaysia M3 League.

To Premier League
Promoted from Liga M3
 Kelantan United
 Kuching

Relegated from Super League
 Perak II
 Selangor II
 Kuala Lumpur FA

Renamed/Rebranded Clubs

 PKNP FC was renamed as Perak FA II and designated as the reserve team of Perak FA.
 In a desperate move by Football Association of Sarawak (FAS), FAS bought Selangor United and rebranded it as Sarawak United and located to Kuching, Sarawak in an attempt to return to Malaysian Premier League and regain their "honour".

Notes: 
  PKNS was demoted to Premier League after their absorption to Selangor, change their status as reserve team, and renamed as Selangor II. UiTM FC was promoted to Super League as replacement.

From Premier League

Promoted to Super League

 PDRM
 Sabah
 UiTM

Relegated to Liga M3

 Sarawak

Stadium and locations

Note: Table lists in alphabetical order.

Personnel and sponsoring

Note: Flags indicate national team as has been defined under FIFA eligibility rules. Players may hold more than one non-FIFA nationality.

Coaching changes
Note: Flags indicate national team as has been defined under FIFA eligibility rules. Players may hold more than one non-FIFA nationality.

Foreign players
The number of foreign players is restricted to four each team including at least one player from the AFC country.

Note: Flags indicate national team as has been defined under FIFA eligibility rules. Players may hold more than one non-FIFA nationality.

  Foreign players who left their clubs or were de-registered from playing squad due to medical issues or other matters.

Results

League table

Result table

Season statistics

Top scorers

Players sorted first by goals, then by last name.

Hat-tricks

Clean sheets

Players sorted first by clean sheets, then by last name.

See also
 2020 Malaysia Super League
 2020 Malaysia FA Cup
 2020 Malaysia Cup

References

External links
 Football Association of Malaysia website
 Football Malaysia LLP website

Malaysia
Malaysia Premier League seasons
1
Malaysia Premier League, 2020